Enemy of Women is a 1944 American anti-Nazi propaganda film directed by Alfred Zeisler. The lead character is Joseph Goebbels, played by Paul Andor.

Plot 
Paul Joseph Goebbels, a down-on-his-luck playwright, boards with German military pensioner Colonel Eberhardt Brandt.  While there, Goebbels falls in love with Brandt's daughter, Maria, an aspiring actress who does not return his affections.  When Goebbels tries to kiss Maria, Col. Brandt kicks him out of the house, demanding Paul never return. Then Goebbels attends a rally and hears Hitler speak. This inspires him to joins the Nazis, where he achieves great success.  Later, as propaganda minister, Goebbels manipulates Maria's career to her benefit, but again attempts to force her into a relationship.  Maria again rejects him, and he uses his power to blacklist her.

Cast 
 Claudia Drake as Maria Brandt
 Paul Andor as Joseph Goebbels
 Donald Woods as Dr. Hans Traeger
 H. B. Warner as Col. Eberhardt Brandt
 Sigrid Gurie as Magda Quandt
 Ralph Morgan as Mr. Quandt
 Gloria Stuart as Bertha
 Robert Barrat as Heinrich Wallburg
 Beryl Wallace as Jenny Hartman
 Byron Foulger as Krause
 Lester Dorr as Hanussen
 Crane Whitley as Hanke
 Charles Halton as Uncle Hugo
 Marin Sais as Mrs. Bendler

Release 
Enemy of Women was originally released November 10, 1944.

Reception 
Bosley Crowther of The New York Times called it lurid and "pitifully unprofessional in virtually every way".  John Sinnot of DVD Talk rated it 3/5 stars and wrote, "While Enemy of Women won't win any awards as an exemplary example of war time propaganda, it does have a certain charm to it and is very interesting to watch."

See also
List of American films of 1944

References

External links 
 
 

1944 films
1940s biographical drama films
American biographical drama films
Films directed by Alfred Zeisler
American World War II propaganda films
American black-and-white films
Films about Nazi Germany
Cultural depictions of Joseph Goebbels
American war drama films
1940s war films
1944 drama films